John Olver (1936–2023) was a United States Representative from Massachusetts's 1st congressional district.

John Olver is also the name of:

John Olver (ice hockey) (born 1958), Canadian ice hockey coach
John Olver (rugby union) (born 1961), English former rugby union player

See also
John Oliver (disambiguation)